Little Russia was an area of Tottenham, London, England. It was on the straight northern boundary of the London Borough of Haringey, specifically adjoining Edmonton, mainly comprising Pretoria Road, Durban Road, and Lorenco Road (west of the railway line between Silver Street and White Hart Lane).

The area had become known as "Little Russia" in the early 20th century due to the influx of Russian immigrants. Immigration peaked when a large number of Russians settled there after fleeing the 1917 Russian Revolution. It developed into one of the toughest areas of North London and the local constabulary usually only policed the area in pairs. The area was mostly redeveloped in the 1970s.

Literature 
In An Edmonton Boy, Terry Webb describes the area:
My mother came out of Tottenham, out of a road called Lorenco Road (now demolished). Now that had the nickname of "Little Russia" – why it had that name I don't know, but it was the roughest area. A lot of costermongers lived down there and the barrow boys and the fruit and vegetable people and they nearly all had horses and carts. The area was completely terraced, one end went into Pretoria Road, Tottenham and the other end went into Queen Street. There was an old pub there called the "Sun and Compass/The Three Compasses" (demolished). It's still there and they tell me that they used to take their horses through the house and keep them in the back garden.

Media
In March 2009, Moscow-born novelist and broadcaster Zinovy Zinik travelled to the area to broadcast The Ghosts of Little Russia on BBC Radio 3.

See also 
Tottenham Outrage

References

External links
 Lorenco Road Tottenham

Areas of London
Districts of the London Borough of Haringey
Ethnic enclaves in the United Kingdom
Russian communities
Russian diaspora in the United Kingdom
Tottenham